Murray Sidman (April 29, 1923 – May 18, 2019) was a behavioral scientist, best known for Sidman Avoidance, also called "free-operant avoidance", in which an individual learns to avoid an aversive stimulus by remembering to produce the response without any other stimulus. Sidman's explanation of free-operant avoidance is an alternative to the Miller-Mowrer two-process theory of avoidance.

Methodology 
Methodologically, a "Sidman avoidance procedure" is an experiment in which the subject is periodically presented with an aversive stimulus, such as the introduction of carbon dioxide or an electric shock, unless they produce a particular response, such as pulling a plunger, which delays the stimulus by a certain amount of time.

His work on methodology for behavioural psychologists is the standard textbook in its field.

Career 
Sidman took his PhD at Columbia in psychology from Columbia University 1952 under the advisorship of William N. Schoenfeld. He has worked at many research institutions, including Harvard Medical School, Johns Hopkins University Medical School, and the Walter Reed Army Institute of Research. He served as director of the Behavioral Sciences Department at the E.K. Shriver Center for Mental Retardation and Developmental Disabilities. Until his death, he was professor emeritus at Northeastern University. Dr. Sidman has held academic appointments at the University of São Paulo in Brasil, Keio University in Tokyo, Japan and the University of Canterbury in Christchurch, New Zealand.

Influence in the field
Sidman initiated the research on stimulus equivalence, and has made important contributions to the field; this is described in Equivalence relations and behavior: A research story. His book Coercion and its fallout is often required reading when discussing ethics and behavior analysis.

Sidman has contributed three major publications to the field of applied behavior analysis. First, his most classic book Coercion and Its Fallout. This book set the groundwork for understand how everyone uses coercion and how to ethically use it to get meaningful behavioral changes. His second book is entitled Equivalence Relations and Behavior: A Research Story. Finally, his third major work is titled Tactics of Scientific Research, which has become a staple for research based psychology.

Dr. Sidman’s publications in peer-refereed journals number close to 100 and have defined much of our current understanding of stimulus control, stimulus equivalence, and avoidance behavior. His 1960 text, Tactics of Scientific Research, is considered the first primer on within- subject research methodology. It is a classic that is still used today. Other contributions have extended to important social problems. The second edition of his book Coercion and Its Fallout was published in 2000, and his treatment of “Terrorism as Behavior” was published in Behavior and Social Issues.

See also
 Experimental analysis of behavior
 Behavior analysis of child development

References

20th-century American psychologists
Behaviourist psychologists
Columbia University alumni
Harvard Medical School people
Johns Hopkins University faculty
Northwestern University faculty
1923 births
2019 deaths